Osage City is an unincorporated community in Cole County, in the U.S. state of Missouri.

History
Osage City was platted in 1867. The community took its name from the nearby Osage River. A post office called Osage City was established in 1856, and remained in operation until 1962.

The Gay Archeological Site was listed on the National Register of Historic Places in 2016.

References

Unincorporated communities in Cole County, Missouri
Unincorporated communities in Missouri
Jefferson City metropolitan area